1962–63 Kuwaiti Premier League was the 2nd season of the First League Division.

Overview
In the second season, the number of teams was reduced to six after the Thanwit Kifan moved away, and the league was played on a home-and-away system as well. Al Arabi managed to win the second title in a row after scoring eighteen points, three points ahead of its rivals Al-Qadsia, scoring 45 goals and conceding only 6 goals.

League table

References
RSSSF

Kuwait Premier League seasons
Kuwait
football